Stephan Henrik Barratt-Due (19 February 1919 – 18 November 1985) was a Norwegian violinist and music teacher and son of violinist Henrik Adam Due (1891–1966) and Mary Barratt Due (b. Barratt, 1888–1969). He married Else Barratt-Due (b. Holst, 1925–2006), and together they had five children, among them pianist Cecilie Barratt-Due (1950–) and violinist Stephan Barratt-Due Jr. (1956–), who is married to violinist Soon-Mi Chung.

Biography 
Barrat-Due studied violin with his father from an early age, and debuted in 1940. He held numerous concerts in Scandinavia, the UK and USA, and was artistic director of the Barratt Due Institute of Music from 1970 to 1985.

References

External links 
Hvem er hvem? / 1948

1919 births
1985 deaths
20th-century Norwegian violinists
Male violinists
Barratt Due Institute of Music alumni
Academic staff of the Barratt Due Institute of Music
Musicians from Oslo
20th-century Norwegian male musicians